Cosmic Osmo's Hex Isle is a 3D puzzle/adventure game for Mac and Windows by Cyan Worlds and Fanista released on November 30, 2007. It is a sequel to the adventure game Cosmic Osmo and the Worlds Beyond the Mackerel, also by Cyan Worlds. Osmo has been incarcerated because of his extreme laziness. The aim is to help Osmo escape from his prison by touching a set of coloured hexagonal targets on each level.

References

External links
 
 
 

2007 video games
Cyan Worlds games
MacOS games
Puzzle video games
Video games about extraterrestrial life
Video games developed in the United States
Windows games
Xbox 360 Live Arcade games